Curbridge and Lew are civil parishes in West Oxfordshire, located to the south-west of Witney, Oxfordshire, that share a common parish council.  The joint body was formed in 2012 by merging the formerly separate parish councils of Lew and Curbridge.

References

West Oxfordshire District